Daniel Bernan Reyes Gadia (born July 3, 1995) is a Filipino professional footballer who plays as a defensive midfielder for Philippines Football League club Cebu and the Philippines national team.

Early life
Daniel Gadia is born to Annaliza and Bernanieto Gadia. Daniel has two other siblings. Gadia was introduced to football in a futsal court in Dapitan Sports Complex. (Dapitan Football Club) Sampaloc, Manila where he was scouted by people from his eventual high school. He attended San Beda College, Rizal for his high school studies. and entered the University of the Philippines for his collegiate studies.

Collegiate career
Gadia plays for the football team of his college, the University of the Philippines at the UAAP. For his efforts during UAAP Season 78, Gadia was named as the Most Valuable Player for the season. By October 2016, he is already on his last playing year with his collegiate team.

Club career
By 2014, Gadia had already have experience playing for Pachanga Diliman at the UFL Cup. In May 2016, Gadia made his league debut at the United Football League for the Loyola Meralco Sparks in a match against Global

The club then joined the Philippines Football League and changed their name to FC Meralco Manila. They played in the inaugural season in 2017 before it was dissolved in January 2018 which left Gadia club-less.

Gadia was picked up by Stallion Laguna, playing two years for the club, in 2019 and 2020.

Gadia was signed by expansion club Cebu F.C. for the 2021 season, which would be his second Cebu-based club, after a brief stint with Global Cebu.

International career

Youth
In 2013, Gadia played for the Philippines U-19 at the 2013 AFF U-19 Youth Championship and the 2014 AFC U-19 Championship qualifiers. He is credited for the last minute goal against Laos in the AFC qualifiers which prevented the national team from ending at the bottom of their group.

Senior
Gadia debuted for the Philippine national football team in a friendly match against Australian club Perth Glory FC in July 2016. However, his first official international cap was made about two months later on October 8, 2016 when he came in as substitute in the 82nd minute for Phil Younghusband in a friendly match against Bahrain. The match ended in a 1–3 defeat.

References

1995 births
Living people
F.C. Meralco Manila players
University Athletic Association of the Philippines footballers
University of the Philippines alumni
Philippines international footballers
Filipino footballers
Sportspeople from Manila
Association football midfielders
Competitors at the 2017 Southeast Asian Games
Southeast Asian Games competitors for the Philippines
Cebu F.C. players